This is a list of tombstone vice admirals in the United States Navy. A tombstone promotion transferred an officer to the retired list with the rank of the next higher grade. Tombstone promotions to vice admiral have been awarded for service during the construction of the Panama Canal and under the Appointments Clause of the United States Constitution, but almost all tombstone vice admirals were advanced to that rank between 1925 and 1959 because they were commended for performance of duty in actual combat before the end of World War II. Tombstone promotions for combat citations were halted on November 1, 1959.

List of U.S. Navy tombstone vice admirals
Each entry lists the officer's name, date appointed rear admiral, date retired and advanced to vice admiral, and other biographical notes.

Panama Canal service
Following the completion of the Panama Canal in 1914, Congress authorized Army and Navy officers who had served more than three years with the Isthmian Canal Commission to be advanced one grade in rank upon retirement. Under this provision, Navy surgeon James F. Leys retired as a vice admiral in 1932, the first Navy staff corps officer to achieve that rank. Despite awarding Army engineer Edgar Jadwin the retired pay of a lieutenant general under almost identical circumstances, the Comptroller General of the United States denied Leys the retired pay of a vice admiral on the grounds that the grade had been abolished in 1890 and all subsequent vice admirals actually held the grade of rear admiral with only the temporary rank of vice admiral, so the grade of vice admiral did not exist. The Court of Claims overturned this decision and gave Leys the retired pay of a vice admiral.

Medical Corps

Combat citations before the end of World War II
From 1925 to 1959, Navy rear admirals could retire with a tombstone promotion to the rank but not the pay of vice admiral, if they were specially commended for their performance of duty in actual combat before the end of World War II. Officers who were promoted to vice admiral while on the active list had precedence on the retired list over those who were advanced to that grade based on combat citations.

Tombstone promotions were based on an officer's grade on the day they actually retired, so a vice admiral could only receive a tombstone promotion to four-star admiral if he still held a three-star job when he retired. For example, when Gerald F. Bogan was relieved of his three-star command only three weeks before he was scheduled to retire with a tombstone promotion to admiral, he reverted to rear admiral and received a tombstone promotion back to vice admiral. Similarly, Robert C. Giffen was reprimanded for misconduct while serving as vice admiral, reverted to rear admiral, and retired with a tombstone promotion back to vice admiral.

By May 29, 1959, 154 out of 198 living retired vice admirals—78 percent—had never served in that rank on active duty. Only 22 percent had served in three-star positions prior to their retirement, the rest being rear admirals who received a tombstone promotion to vice admiral at retirement. Congress stopped all tombstone promotions effective November 1, 1959.

Line

Line (Reserve)

Medical Corps

Supply Corps

Chaplain Corps (Reserve)

Civil Engineer Corps

Civil Engineer Corps (Reserve)

Dental Corps

Appointments Clause
The President can use his plenary power under the Appointments Clause of the United States Constitution to nominate any officer to be retired in a higher grade, subject to Senate confirmation. For example, John D. Bulkeley served as president of the Board of Inspection and Survey for 21 years, having been retired in 1974 but immediately recalled to active duty, and was advanced to vice admiral on the retired list under the Appointments Clause when he retired permanently in August 1988. Levering Smith served as technical director or program head of the Navy's submarine-launched ballistic missile program for 20 years, having also been retired and recalled to active duty in 1974, and was promoted to vice admiral when he finally stepped down in November 1977.

Line

Legislative history
The following list of Congressional legislation concerns tombstone promotions to the grade of vice admiral in the United States Navy. Each entry lists an act of Congress, its citation in the United States Statutes at Large, and a summary of the act's relevance.

See also
 List of United States Navy tombstone admirals
 List of United States Navy vice admirals on active duty before 1960
 Tombstone promotion
 Vice admiral (United States)

Citations

General and cited references 
 
 
 
 
 

 
United States Navy
United States Navy admirals
United States Navy admirals
Admirals